Outback Vampires is a 1987 Australian film directed by Colin Eggleston and features Richard Morgan, Angela Kennedy, Brett Climo and Richard Carter. It was written by Colin Eggleston and David Young. It was filmed in Yarralumla, Australian Capital Territory, Australia.

Plot
Whilst on their way to a rodeo festival Lucy (Angela Kennedy), Nick (Richard Morgan) and Bronco's (Brett Climo) car breaks down, leaving them stranded in a small town. The odd-ball locals send them to Sir Alfred's house on the top of hill where once inside things become even weirder. Sir Alfred's wife seems quite deranged, his daughter almost psychotic and his son is extremely eccentric. After becoming separated, Lucy, Nick and Bronco are taken on a surrealist journey through the mansion, which is still decorated with Christmas decorations. The scenes in the house are shot in blue-tones, characters are able to climb on walls, people are told to "follow the bouncing ball", doors suddenly vanish and there is a music-video style performance by a band at one point. The three friends must band together to find a way out of this haunted house and rid the town of this un-dead family once and for all.

Production
The film was also known as The Wicked and  Prince at the Court of Yarralumla.
The film was not released in cinemas and aired on TV 18 June 1988.

References

External links

Outback Vampires at AustLit
Outback Vampires at The Cinerarium

1987 horror films
1980s comedy horror films
Australian horror films
Films directed by Colin Eggleston
1987 films
Australian comedy horror films
1987 comedy films
Vampires in film
1980s English-language films
1980s Australian films